The 2006 Kremlin Cup was a tennis tournament played on indoor carpet courts. It was the 17th edition of the Kremlin Cup, and was part of the International Series of the 2006 ATP Tour, and of the Tier I Series of the 2006 WTA Tour. It took place at the Olympic Stadium in Moscow, Russia from 9 October through 15 October 2006.

Finals

Men's singles

 Nikolay Davydenko defeated  Marat Safin, 6–4, 5–7, 6–4
It was Nikolay Davydenko's 4th title of the year, and his 9th overall. It was his 2nd win at the event after winning in 2004.

Women's singles

 Anna Chakvetadze defeated  Nadia Petrova, 6–4, 6–4
It was Anna Chakvetadze's 2nd title of the year, and her 2nd overall. It was her 1st Tier I title of the year, and her 1st overall.

Men's doubles

 Fabrice Santoro /  Nenad Zimonjić defeated  František Čermák /  Jaroslav Levinský, 6–1, 7–5
 It was Santoro's 4th title of the year and the 22nd of his career. It was Zimonjić's 3rd title of the year and the 13th of his career.

Women's doubles

 Květa Peschke /  Francesca Schiavone defeated  Iveta Benešová /  Galina Voskoboeva, 6–4, 6–7(4–7), 6–1
 It was Peschke's 4th title of the year and the 8th of his career. It was Schiavone's 3rd title of the year and the 7th of his career.

External links
 Official website 
 Men's Singles draw
 Men's Doubles draw
 Men's Qualifying Singles draw
 Women's Singles, Doubles and Qualifying Singles draws

Kremlin Cup
Kremlin Cup
Kremlin Cup
Kremlin Cup
Kremlin Cup
Kremlin Cup